Arehalli  is a village in the state of Karnataka in southern India. It is located in the Belur taluk of Hassan district in Karnataka, and is about 230 kilometres from the state capital Bangalore, and 146 kilometres from the chief port city of Mangalore. It is well connected by road through the city of Hassan. The nearest airport is Mangalore International Airport, and Sakleshpur Railway Station is located at a distance of 14 kilometres.

Agriculture
Local farmers grow coffee (also known as Arehalli Koffee) on their plantation lands. Arehalli contributes 40% of coffee to Karnataka's 71% of contribution in the country's coffee production. According to Arnold Wright, who wrote a book on the state of Mysore dated 1914, Sir Basil Scott (former Chief Justice of Bombay, British India in 1914) owned a coffee plantation in Arehalli.

Demographics
As of 2001 India census, Arehalli had a population of 6339 with 3141 males and 3198 females.

See also
 Hassan
 Districts of Karnataka

References

External links
 http://Hassan.nic.in/
 https://web.archive.org/web/20170110085804/http://www.arehalli.com/

Villages in Hassan district